Luca Denicolà (born 17 April 1981) is a former footballer from Switzerland who played as defender.

External links
football.ch profile

1981 births
Swiss people of Italian descent
Living people
People from Moesa District
Swiss men's footballers
Switzerland under-21 international footballers
Association football defenders
Grasshopper Club Zürich players
BSC Young Boys players
FC Aarau players
FC Lugano players
FC Vaduz players
Swiss Super League players
Swiss Challenge League players
Swiss expatriate footballers
Expatriate footballers in Liechtenstein
Swiss expatriate sportspeople in Liechtenstein
Sportspeople from Graubünden